Brzegi may refer to the following villages in Poland:
Brzegi, Tatra County in Lesser Poland Voivodeship (south Poland)
Brzegi, Wieliczka County in Lesser Poland Voivodeship (south Poland)
Brzegi, Masovian Voivodeship (east-central Poland)
Brzegi, Świętokrzyskie Voivodeship (south-central Poland)
Brzegi, Greater Poland Voivodeship (west-central Poland)